The Supaṇṇa Saṃyutta is a Buddhist scripture of the Pali Canon. It is the 30th Saṃyutta in the Saṃyutta Nikāya, placed in the Khandha Vaggasaṃyutta.

Content
The Supaṇṇa Saṃyutta, also known as the Linked Discourses on Phoenixes, provides basic accounts of the nature of the garuḍas; avian deities in Buddhist mythology. The Buddha describes these beings in regards to their mode of birth, hierarchy, as well as the reasons one may be reborn among them.

Suttas
A total of forty-six suttas are found in the text. Suttas 4–6, 7-16 and 17-46 are each abbreviated into a single discourse.
1) Suddhika Sutta
2) Haranti Sutta
3) Dvayakārī Sutta
4-6) Dutiyādidvayakārīsuttattika 
7-16) Aṇḍajadānūpakārasuttadasaka
17-46) Jalābujadānūpakārasuttattiṃsaka

English translations
 Sutta Central: Bhikkhu Sujato
 Mettanet Tipitaka Index: Bhikkuni Uppalavanna

See also
Pāli Canon
Sutta Pitaka
Saṃyutta Nikāya

References

Samyutta Nikaya